Sebastian Pedersen (born 8 June 1999) is a Norwegian football striker who currently plays for 2. divisjon side Moss.

Pedersen, who is a younger brother of Marcus Pedersen, started his career in HamKam. At the age of 16, he went from their junior team to that of Stabæk, and also started attending the Norwegian College of Elite Sport. He made his first-team debut one year later, as a late-match substitute in August 2016 against Haugesund. He scored his first goal in his third match as a substitute, against Lillestrøm.

He signed for Strømsgodset in January 2018.

Career statistics

References

External links

1999 births
Living people
Sportspeople from Hamar
Norwegian footballers
Norway youth international footballers
Norway under-21 international footballers
Stabæk Fotball players
Strømsgodset Toppfotball players
Strømmen IF players
Florø SK  players
Notodden FK players
Hamarkameratene players
Moss FK players
Eliteserien players
Norwegian First Division players
Association football forwards